Anna Goldsworthy (born 9 June 1974) is an Australian writer, teacher and classical pianist.

Life
Goldsworthy was born in Adelaide as the eldest daughter of the writer Peter Goldsworthy and Helen Goldsworthy. She began studying the piano at the age of six. At the age of eleven she was accepted into the Elder Conservatorium, studying with the pedagogue Eleonora Sivan, to whom she attributes the fact that she is now a pianist. Goldsworthy completed her Bachelor of Music degree with honours at the Elder Conservatorium before acquiring a Master of Music degree at Texas Christian University, where she held the F. Howard and Mary D. Walsh Graduate Piano Scholarship and studied with Tamás Ungár. In 2004, she graduated from the University of Melbourne with a Doctor of Musical Arts degree under the supervision of Ronald Farren-Price, who has been an important mentor. Her thesis topic was "Fanny Hensel and Virtuosity". Additionally, Goldsworthy has studied in Moscow with Lev Naumov – a pupil of Heinrich Neuhaus, who had been a pupil of Leopold Godowsky – with the support of an Arts SA Emerging Artist Award, and in the Advanced Performance Program at the Australian National Academy of Music.

Musical career
Goldsworthy is an accomplished classical pianist. In 2009 she was a juror for Chamber Music Australia's Asia Pacific Chamber Music Competition.

In 2004, Goldsworthy completed a world tour performing in festivals and concert halls in Australia, Asia, Europe and North and South America. Highlights included appearances at the Teatro Colón for the Buenos Aires International Music Festival, at the Prince Yong Theatre in Beijing, for the Orchestra of Colours in Athens, and for the Festival Musicale delli Nazioni in Rome. In 2005, she performed the Clara Schumann concerto in the Masters Series of the Adelaide Symphony Orchestra, and undertook a three-month residency at the Australia Council Studio at the Cité internationale des arts in Paris. She currently teaches piano at the University of Melbourne, and the University of Adelaide – alongside Stefan Ammer and Lucinda Collins – and is artist-in-residence at Janet Clarke Hall.

Goldsworthy is a former artistic director of the Port Fairy Spring Music Festival. She was appointed in May 2009, succeeding in 2010 Stephen McIntyre who retired after the 2009 festival. She was since 2019 artistic director of the Coriole Music Festival in McLaren Vale until she was appointed director of the Elder Conservatorium of Music at the University of Adelaide.

Her debut solo CD, Come With Us, was released by ABC Classics in January 2008. In March 2010 with her trio, Seraphim Trio, she recorded Schubert's Trout Quintet for ABC Classics. In July 2010 she recorded for ABC Classics the music that features in her book Piano Lessons. Her two-part radio documentary on the Mendelssohn siblings Fanny and Felix, Art is not for women: only for girls, was broadcast on ABC Classic FM in 2004.

Alongside Goldsworthy's solo performances, she has received acclaim as a chamber musician. She is a founding member of the Seraphim Trio, which has performed throughout Asia and Europe, and appears regularly in Australia for Musica Viva. The trio studied chamber music with Hatto Beyerle at the Hochschule für Musik, Theater und Medien Hannover, and was awarded the prize for the Leading Piano Trio in the 2001 National Chamber Music Competition. In 2007, the trio launched a national concert series.

Writing
Goldsworthy has published numerous essays on music and cultural issues, and writes regularly for The Monthly.

Her memoir Piano Lessons was released by Black Inc in September 2009. It was shortlisted in the 2010 New South Wales Premier's Literary Awards for Best Non Fiction and in the 2010 Australian Book Industry Awards in the categories of Best Non-Fiction and the Newcomer of the Year, which she won. The book was sold to St. Martin's Press in the US and the movie rights have been sold to Australian director Ana Kokkinos.

Welcome to Your New Life, also a memoir, was released by Black Inc in March 2013.

Anna Goldsworthy is credited alongside her father, Peter Goldsworthy, as writing the stage adaptation of Maestro which the State Theatre Company of South Australia performed in early 2009. Piano Lessons was adapted by Anna Goldsworthy as a stage presentation for the Queensland Music Festival in August 2011.

She published her third book, Melting Moments, her first work of fiction, and released it on 3 March 2020. It is a domestic book set in South Australia beginning in 1941, with the main character, Ruby, who travels to Adelaide. It was officially released at the 2020 Adelaide Writers' Week, with an interview of Goldsworthy and Black Inc. author Anna Krien, who discussed how it felt going from "fact to fiction".

Bibliography

Books

Essays and reporting
"Unfinished Business: Sex, Freedom and Misogyny" in Quarterly Essay, no. 50, June 2013 
Articles and essays published in The Monthly:
 "A Change is Gonna Come", February 2007, no. 20
 "The Beast of Beethoven", May 2007, no. 23
 "Do Androids Dream of Electric Pianos?", June 2007, no. 24
 "Ein Schwindel!", August 2007, no. 26
 "Like Love in a Marriage", September 2007, no. 27
 "Wunderbar", December 2007, January 2008, no. 30
 "Improvisations", March 2008, no. 32
 "Voices of the land", September 2014.

Critical studies and reviews
 Review of Welcome to Your New Life.

Awards
Piano
Arts SA Emerging Artist Award
David Paul Landa Memorial Scholarship for Pianists
Finalist 2010 Melbourne Prize

Writing
Winner, 2010 Australian Book Industry Awards for Newcomer of the Year
Shortlisted 2011 National Biography Award
Shortlisted 2010 Australian Book Industry Awards for Best Non-Fiction
Shortlisted 2010 New South Wales Premier's Literary Awards Douglas Stewart Prize for Non-Fiction
Shortlisted 2010 Colin Roderick Award
Shortlisted 2021 Colin Roderick Award

References

External links

Seraphim Trio website
Piano Lessons

1974 births
Living people
Australian women novelists
Australian classical pianists
Australian women pianists
People educated at Pembroke School, Adelaide
University of Adelaide alumni
Academic staff of the University of Adelaide
University of Melbourne alumni
Musicians from Adelaide
Writers from Adelaide
21st-century classical pianists
21st-century women pianists